Komet is the ninth studio album by German Neue Deutsche Härte band Megaherz, released on the 23rd of February 2018. It is the highest-charting Megaherz album to date.

Track listing

Reception
The album has received generally positive reviews. Loudersound.com gave the album a 3.5/5, saying "Rammstein’s industrial contemporaries pack a weightier punch". Webzine Distorted Sound gave the album a 8/10, saying "Overall, Megaherz have demonstrated that yet again, they understand industrial metal as a genre inside and out. Here on Komet, they masterfully play within the limits of what can be done with the genre, and often cross completely out of those boundaries altogether". Metalhammer.it gave the album an 80/100 too, saying "Megaherz always keep the rudder straight on the NDH canons".

Charts

References

2018 albums
German-language albums
Megaherz albums